Birthplace Unknown is a 1988 Dutch documentary film by director Karin Junger, featuring two South-Korean girls who were adopted by a Dutch family. The director follows the two young women as they visit South Korea, their country of birth.

Awards

 VPRO IDFA Award for Best Feature-Length Documentary (1988)

External links
 
 Birthplace Unknown documentary online

Dutch documentary films
1988 films
1988 documentary films
Documentary films about adoption
Films shot in South Korea